Romanov is a brand of vodka manufactured and marketed by United Spirits which is a subsidiary of United Breweries Group. The brand derives its name from the Romanov dynasty which ruled the Russian Empire from 1612 to 1917. It has a two star rating from the International Taste and Quality Institute. It has a 42.8% alcohol by volume. Sale of Romanov vodka in 2006 was 8.5 lakh (850,000) cases.

Variants
Romanov comes in four flavours-
 Premium
 Orange
 Lemon
 Apple
Romanov Red is another brand name owned by USL used for marketing vodka as well as non-alcoholic energy drinks.

In 2007 United Spirits introduced variant named Romanov Diet Mate Vodka which was claimed to control cholesterol level and burn body fat due to herbal contents like Garcinia

Sales and Popular Culture
Romanov is one of the cheapest vodkas available in India and thus it is popular in low-cost clubs and with college going students. Romanov along with White Mischief control 70% of India's domestic market of close to 3 million cases which increased to 89% in 2010. In 2006, Shilpa Shetty was chosen as its brand ambassador.

Gallery

References

External links
Romanov Vodka USL Official Site
American UBS Site

Alcoholic drink brands
Indian drink brands
Indian vodkas
United Spirits brands